Barking Abbey School is a secondary school and specialist sports and humanities college located in the London Borough of Barking and Dagenham. It serves students from the London Boroughs of Barking and Dagenham, Redbridge, and Newham. Years 7 to 11 (ages 11 – 16) are at the Longbridge Road site and years 7 to 13 (ages 11 – 18) at the Sandringham Road site. Barking Abbey also has a Sixth Form of over 400 students which is at the Sandringham Road site. A Level and BTEC courses are available to 16 - 18 year-olds in the Sixth Form. Both sites are situated to the west of Mayesbrook Park and to the north of Upney Underground station.

History
Barking Abbey School was founded in 1922, the first co-educational grammar school in England. The first headmaster was Colonel Ernest Loftus, who stayed for 27 years, being replaced by Mr Frank Young DFC in 1949.

In 2005, Barking Abbey started the Barking Abbey Basketball Academy. This enabled younger players from around London, Essex, and Hertfordshire to experience the life of being in a basketball academy, preparing some of them to move abroad on scholarships to various countries around the world. It has been announced that Barking Abbey will become the first pilot Regional Institute of Basketball within Great Britain.

In 2007, Barking Abbey's Dance Department opened its Dance Academy as a "centre of excellence".

It has introduced the teaching of Latin, making it one of the few state schools in London to offer this course.

Historic records of Barking Abbey School for 1922-1977 are held at Barking and Dagenham Archive Service, Valence House Museum. This collections includes early pupil records, staff records, sports, photographs, and house record books.

Academic performance
In 2019, the school's Progress 8 benchmark at GCSE was above average. 49% of children at the school achieved Grade 5 or above in both English and maths GCSEs, compared to the Barking and Dagenham average of 43% and the national average, also 43%. The school's Attainment 8 score at GCSE was 49, compared to the Barking and Dagenham average of 47 and the national average, also 47.

At A-Level in 2019, the school's Progress score was below average. The average result was C-, compared to the Barking and Dagenham average of C and the national average of C+. The percentage of students completing their A level courses was 97%, compared to the Barking and Dagenham average of 91% and the national average of 91%.

Notable former pupils

 Graham Allen, writer and academic
 Ravi Bopara, Essex and England cricketer
 Billy Bragg, musician (spent a year at Park Modern Secondary School)
 Leanne Brown, Great Britain World Junior Flatwater Canoeist
 Wayne Brown, footballer
 Malcolm Eden, member of indie pop band McCarthy
 Tim Gane, member of McCarthy and Stereolab
 Robert Gilchrist, professional basketball player
 Michael Hector, footballer
 JJ Jegede, British long jumper
 Joss Labadie, footballer
 Danis Salman, footballer
Akwasi Yeboah, basketball player
 Bobby Zamora, footballer

Barking Abbey Grammar School

 Carole Ann Ford, actor, played Susan Foreman from 1963-64 in Doctor Who 
 C. J. Freezer, model railway enthusiast
 Sir Brian Jarman OBE, physician and academic
 Steve Mogford, Chief executive since 2011 of United Utilities Group plc
 Brian Poole, lead singer of The Tremeloes
 Prof Alan Smithers, (attended 1949–56), author, broadcaster and educationist
 Victor Rice, industrialist, ex-CEO of Massey Ferguson and LucasVarity

Arms

See also 
 List of schools in the United Kingdom
 Education in England

References

External links 
 Barking Abbey School website
 Barking Abbey Basketball Academy
 EduBase
 Barking Abbey School Videos
 Valence House Museum: Barking Abbey School Archives

Secondary schools in the London Borough of Barking and Dagenham
Educational institutions established in 1922
1922 establishments in England
Community schools in the London Borough of Barking and Dagenham
Barking, London
Specialist sports colleges in England
Specialist humanities colleges in England